Ljubomir Nenadović (14 September 1826 — 21 January 1895) was Serbian writer, poet, translator, diplomat, minister of education and member of the Serbian Royal Academy.

Family 
Ljubomir was born in Brankovina, Valjevo, Principality of Serbia, to father Prota Mateja Nenadović, of the affluent Nenadović family. His father was Serbian archpriest, writer and leader in the First Serbian Uprising; he was appointed Prime Minister 27 August 1805 – Jan 1807 by President Karađorđe. Ljubomir's uncle Sima and his grandfather's brother Jakov also fought in the Serbian Revolution, and served the Serbian revolutionary government. His grandfather was Aleksa Nenadović (1749–1804), one of the first victims of the Slaughter of the Dukes on 31 January 1804.

Life 

He graduated from the gymnasium in Belgrade and enrolled at the Lyceum. In the period between 1844 and 1848 he studied at universities in Prague, Berlin and Heidelberg. After he returned to Serbia in 1848 he became professor at Lyceum.

In 1850 Nenadović founded the literary review Šumadinka. This magazine he edited and published between 1850 and 1857 sometimes together with almanac Šumadinče in which he published his father's manuscripts about the First Serbian uprising, (Rukopisi Prote Mateje Nenadovića). Until 1857 he was employed with Ministry of education and internal affairs. He corresponded with writers Đorđe Rajković (1825–1886), Ludwig August von Frankl, Vuk Stefanović Karadžić, and Milica Stojadinović-Srpkinja to whom he dedicated a poem. In 1857 he went to Cetinje in Montenegro. He had frequent correspondence with Montenegrin Knjaz Danilo and organized delivery of one printing press to him. In 1858 he was secretary of the mission of Principality of Serbia in Istanbul. In 1859 he was appointed to be head of the Ministry of Education. In 1868 he retired and lived in Valjevo until 1874 when he left for Montenegro where he stayed until 1878. From 1878 until his death in 1895 he lived in Valjevo.

Serbian Academy of Sciences and Arts

The first academicians to be appointed in the Serbian Academy of Sciences and Arts on 5 April 1887 were four for each professional academy. The first members of the Academy of Natural Sciences were Josif Pančić, Dimitrije Nešić, Ljubomir Klerić and Jovan Žujović; in the Academy of Philosophical Sciences these were Stojan Novaković, Milan Kujundžić Aberdar, Svetislav Vulović and Svetomir Nikolajević; first members of the Academy of Social Sciences were Čedomilj Mijatović, Milan Milićević, Ljubomir Kovačević (1848–1918) and Panta Srećković; and in the Academy of Arts: Ljubomir Nenadović, Matija Ban, Mihailo Valtrović and Davorin Jenko. The oldest member, Josif Pančić, was appointed the president and the youngest member, Jovan Žujović, was temporarily chosen as permanent secretary.

Selected bibliography 

The first texts he wrote were published in Podunavka magazine in 1843.

His prose works include:
 Pisma iz Nemačke
 Pisma iz Italije
 Pisma iz Švajcarske
 Putopisi
 Rukopisi Prote Mateje Nenadovića
 O Crnogorcima, pisma sa Cetinja, 1878. godine,
 Razgovori s Njegošem
 Moja završna na klevete Dr. Mladena Jojkića protiv srpske Ujedinjene Omladine i moje ličnosti

Legacy 
A library in Valjevo is named after him. There is a plaquette named after Ljubomir P Nenadović. It is awarded every year since 1994 by Kolubara magazine to Valjevo citizen of the year.

References

External links 
 Biography on the website of SANU

1826 births
1895 deaths
19th-century Serbian people
Ljubomir
Members of the Serbian Academy of Sciences and Arts
Government ministers of Serbia
People from the Principality of Serbia
People from the Kingdom of Serbia
Education ministers of Serbia